Shrine Catholic Schools is a private, co-educational, Roman Catholic school serving preschool through grade 12. It is located in Royal Oak, Michigan and affiliated with National Shrine of the Little Flower Church.

The school consists of Shrine Catholic Grade School on one campus and Shrine Catholic Academy (middle school) and Shrine Catholic High School on another campus.

The school was founded as "Little Flower High School," an all-girls school, in the late 1930s. The all-boys school, "Shrine High School", was added later, and the schools were eventually merged.

History
Father Charles Coughlin helped establish the institution while serving as one of the first Roman Catholic priests to preach to a widespread audience over the medium of radio during the Great Depression. His program became increasingly controversial as World War II approached, bringing national attention to the parish. The Bishop asked Fr. Coughlin to give up his radio show, which he did. The school maintained the name "Shrine of the Little Flower High School" into the 1960s, when it became "Shrine High School" until its latest name change in 2001.

Academy & High School Campus
Shrine's 6th through 12th grade campus is located on 20 acres in Royal Oak, Michigan. Features of the school include a chapel, learning resource center, an academic and college counseling center, three science labs, a two-story visual arts lab, football field, 2 fitness centers, and a student center dining hall. A new field house and the new Sanders Auditorium are the result of a renovation on the schools campus. Current technology is found throughout the school. The school has recently renovated classrooms to help support the addition of 6th grade students into the academy.

Athletics
Shrine participates in the Michigan High School Athletic Association (MHSAA) and is a member of the Catholic High School League (CHSL) in the Roman Catholic Archdiocese of Detroit. The school has placed 17 athletes into the CHSL Hall of Fame.

Shrine's sports include men's and women's basketball, golf, cross-country, football, men's hockey, men's and women's soccer, women's softball, women's volleyball, men's and women's track and field, men's baseball, women's skiing, and women's tennis.

State championships

Notable alumni
Kristen Bell (1998), actress
Tom Cooney (1986), former senior U.S. State Department diplomat
Mike Haggerty, former NFL football player
Keegan-Michael Key (1989), actor and comedian
Tom Lewand (1987), former executive vice president and chief operating officer of the Detroit Lions
Connie Paraskevin (1979), four-time world champion track cycling champion
Jim Seymour (1964), former NFL football wide receiver
Bill Simpson (1970), former NFL football defensive back
John Wangler (1976), former University of Michigan football quarterback

References

External links
Shrine Catholic Schools

Roman Catholic Archdiocese of Detroit
Catholic secondary schools in Michigan
Educational institutions established in 1941
Schools in Oakland County, Michigan
High schools in Oakland County, Michigan
Schools in Royal Oak, Michigan
1941 establishments in Michigan
Private K-12 schools in Michigan